Rob Aickin was New Zealand's top record producer in the late 70's early 80s. He produced many gold and platinum records for artists like, Patsy Riggir, Hello Sailor, Golden Harvest, Th Dudes With Dave Dobbyn , Toni Williams , Murray Grindlay and many others while working for Stebbing Recording studios.

Career

1960s
In the early 1960s, he was in a band from an Auckland called Papakura. The band was called Four Quarters. Later he was bass player in a group from Clevedon, just outside of Auckland called The Clevedonaires. Other members were Ron and Graham Brown on guitar and drums and sister Gaye playing keyboards. In 1966, they were signed by Benny Levin to his record label, Impact. After releasing a few singles they were set to go to Vietnam to entertain the troops. As the Vietnam War was escalating their promoter didn't guarantee them return tickets. So they went to Australia instead. They did quite well and eventually became a group called Bitch.  Aickin came back to New Zealand in the mid-1970s.

In 2015, he was interviewed for the NZ Musician magazine about his days with The Clevdonaires and Bitch. It was published in the June/July issue.

Producer
Rob Aickin was the "in house" producer at Stebbing Studios in Auckland.

In 1978, he won the Producer of the year award for the Hello Sailor album by Hello Sailor.

Production

References

External links
 Website
 Discogs: List of productions

New Zealand record producers
New Zealand musicians
New Zealand bass guitarists
Male bass guitarists
New Zealand male guitarists
New Zealand guitarists